Frontier Poetry is an American poetry magazine and publisher based in Portland, Oregon and Los Angeles, California. Established in 2016 by founding editors, Kim Winternheimer and Joshua Roark, the publication serves a platform for publishing and discovering new and emerging poets. It actively seeking work from previously unpublished writers. Frontier Poetry receives over 70,000 visitors monthly, and as of December 2017 is ranked in top five page rank for online poetry publishers on the web.

Working with authors such as Pulitzer Prize winner Tyehimba Jess and industry leaders such as Don Share of Poetry Magazine and Jeff Shotts of Graywolf Press Frontier Poetry awards an "Award for New Poets" annually, which showcases and promotes emerging poets. It also publishes poetry weekly by new writers online, as well as essays and commentary from guests including: Kwame Dawes of Prairie Schooner, John Skoyles of Ploughshares, Xandria Phillips of Winter Tangerine, and Jessica Faust of The Southern Review.

The publication hosts several other contests year round, including its fellowship program, which offers financial assistance and grants to emerging poets, publication, and mentorship opportunities. All authors published on Frontier Poetry are compensated for their work, and was officially listed in Poets & Writers and Poetry Society of America based on their independent assessment of visitation volume.

Online 
Frontier Poetry publishes much of its content online and boasts over 500,000 annual site visitors. Poetry, essays, interviews with important literary figures, craft essays, submission opportunities to other literary magazines and publications, book reviews by début authors such as Aja Monet of Haymarket Books, and literary and cultural criticism are consistent features. The Chicago Review of Books notes that being a digital platform gives Frontier a distinct advantage of immediacy and urgency.

Publications and Awards 
Frontier Poetry focuses on emerging writers with the aim to “lift people up who are just breaking into the community.” yet occasionally publishes works from established poets as well. They are open to writers with multiple chapbooks, self-published collections or saw a circulation below 3000 copies. Frontier Poetry accepts submissions and poems from writers around the world as an effort to bring forth new voices into the community. Frontier also sees regular publication on Verse Daily.

Digital Chapbook
The Frontier Poetry Digital Chapbook serves as an endorsement for new writers. Printed annually, one poet receives a digital edition of their chapbook, cash prizes, and distribution online. Aside from high visibility on Frontier Poetry, the chapbook is also part of a mailing to agents, with the aim of connecting new writers with representation via working with such established poets such as Jericho Brown.

New Voices
New Voices appear online every Friday throughout the year. This category is open throughout the year and invites emerging writers to submit poetry, selected by Frontier Poetry staff. At minimum, two authors are chosen each month from this free category and are paid for publication rights.

A full list of New Voices authors appears on the publication's website.

Featured poetry
Frontier Poetry also provides Featured Poetry, or poems written by established guest writers to appear online throughout the year. In this way, the publication aligns their new writers with established writers while offering free access to poetry to its readership.

Featured Writers and Collaborators in Frontier Poetry

 Hanif Willis-Abdurraqib, 2017 (Poem)
 Jim Daniels, 2017 (Poem)
 Safia Elhillo, 2017 (Poem)
 Kaveh Akbar, 2017 (Poem)
 Mai Der Vang, 2017 (Poem)
 Tiana Clark, 2017 (Poem)
 Kwame Dawes, 2017 (Editors Talk Interview)
 Tyehimba Jess, 2017 (Judge)
 John Skoyles, 2017 (Editors Talk Interview)
 Jos Charles, 2017 (Poem), 2018 (Interview)
 Jessica Faust, 2018 (Editors Talk Interview)
 Greg Brownderville, 2018 (Editors Talk Interview)
 Sumita Chakraborty, 2018 (Editors Talk Interview)
 Don Share, 2018 (Editors Talk Interview, Judge)
 Hannah Aizenman, 2018 (Editors Talk Interview)
 Marion Wrenn, 2018 (Editors Talk Interview)
 Melissa Crowe, 2018 (Editors Talk Interview)
 Gabrielle Bates, 2018 (Editors Talk Interview)
 Tallinn Tahajian, 2018 (Editors Talk Interview)
 Matthew Zapruder, 2018 (Judge)
 Chelene Knight, 2019 (Editors Talk Interview)
 Rick Barot, 2019 (Editors Talk Interview)
 Lisa Spaar, 2019 (In Class Interview)
 Debra Marquart, 2019 (In Class Interview)
 Victoria Chang, 2019 (In Class Interview, Judge)
 Ocean Vuong, 2019 (Judge)
 Eve Ewing, 2019 (Judge)
 Sarah Gambito, 2019 (Interview, Judge)

References

External links
 Frontier Poetry (official website)

American poetry awards
Magazines established in 2016
Magazines published in Portland, Oregon
Online literary magazines published in the United States
Poetry magazines published in the United States